Wanwan Meixiangdao may refer to:

Surprise (web series), a 2013–2015 Chinese web comedy series
Surprise (2015 film), a 2015 Chinese film based on the series